Aleksei Chernov may refer to:

 Aleksei Chernov (footballer, born 1974), Russian football player
 Aleksei Chernov (footballer, born 1998), Russian football player
 Aleksei Ivanovich Chernov (ru) (born 1924), Hero of the Soviet Union
 Aleksei Yevgenyevich Chernov (ru) (born 1982), Russian pianist and composer